František Roubík (1890–1974) was an eminent Czech historian. He was an archivist for aristocratic family Czernin.

20th-century Czech historians
1890 births
1974 deaths